Beach soccer competition at the 2016 Asian Beach Games was held in Da Nang, Vietnam from 25 September to 2 October 2016 at Biển Đông Park.

Medalists

Results

First round

Group A

Group B

Group C

Group D

Knockout round

Quarterfinals

Semifinals

Bronze medal match

Gold medal match

Goalscorers

10 goals

 
 

8 goals

 
 

7 goals

 

6 goals

 

5 goals

 
 
 
 

4 goals

 
 
 

3 goals

 
 
 
 
 
 
 
 
 
 
 
 

2 goals

 
 
 
 
 
 
 
 
 
 
 

1 goal

References

External links
Official website
Official Result Book – Beach Soccer

2016 Asian Beach Games events
Beach
2016
Asian Beach Games